Ivlevo is a rural locality (a village) in Mayskoye Rural Settlement, Vologodsky District, Vologda Oblast, Russia. The population was 20 as of 2002.

Geography 
Ivlevo is located 1 km west of Vologda (the district's administrative centre) by road. Maysky is the nearest  locality.

References 

Rural localities in Vologodsky District